Treetop Flyers are an English folk rock band based in London, England. They won the Glastonbury Festival Emerging Talent Competition 2011. and released their debut album The Mountain Moves on  Loose on 29 April 2013 and on Partisan Records in the US on 25 June 2013.

Discography

Albums
 The Mountain Moves (2013)
 Palomino (2016)
 Treetop Flyers (2018)
 Old Habits (2021)

Singles
 "To Bury The Past" (2009)
 "It's About Time" (2011)
 "Castlewood Road" (2021)

References

External links
 Official website
 Label artist page - Loose Music

English folk musical groups
British folk rock groups
2009 establishments in England
Musical groups established in 2009
Musical groups from London
Loose Music artists
Partisan Records artists